James Ralph "Jim" Dunbar (July 17, 1930 – May 14, 2018) was an American competition rower and Olympic champion. He was born in Crawfordsville, Indiana. At the 1952 Summer Olympics in Helsinki, Finland, he and his teammates, all members of the U.S. Naval Academy's Crew Team, captured the gold medal in the men's eight rowing competition (Coxed eights) for the U.S.

Following his Olympic win, Dunbar graduated from the United States Naval Academy and joined the U.S. Air Force where he spent his career as a fighter pilot, retiring as a full colonel in 1982. He flew an F-105 Thunderchief in combat in the Vietnam war, and received the Distinguished Flying Cross. He has stayed connected to the sport of rowing by coaching high school rowing teams, including the J.E.B. Stuart High School Crew Team in Fairfax County, Virginia.  He has also raised money for local rowing teams and was involved in choosing the site for rowing competition in the 1996 Olympic Games in Atlanta.

References

External links
 

1930 births
2018 deaths
People from Crawfordsville, Indiana
Rowers at the 1952 Summer Olympics
Olympic gold medalists for the United States in rowing
Recipients of the Distinguished Flying Cross (United States)
American male rowers
Medalists at the 1952 Summer Olympics